The University of Traditional Medicine, Mandalay (UTM), in Aungmyethazan, Mandalay, is a public university of Burmese traditional medicine. The Ministry of Health and Sports administered university under the department of traditional medicine offers a five-year Bachelor of Myanmar Traditional Medicine degree program and accepts about 100 students a year.

History
UTM was established in 2001 on an 11.42-acre (4.62-hectare) campus. Its present building complex was completed in 2004.

Program
The university accepts about 100 students annually, based solely on their university entrance exam scores. The total enrollment is 602 for the 2008 academic year. The university offers a five-year program including a one-year internship and confers a BMTM (Bachelor of Myanmar Traditional Medicine) degree.

 First year: literature and basic science subjects such as Burmese, English, Pali and Sanskrit (Oriental Studies), physics, chemistry, zoology, botany, behavioral science and Pharmacology(TM), computer science.
 Second year: Basic Medical Sciences (Western) subjects—anatomy, physiology, biochemistry, pathology and microbiology, and Basic Medical Science (Traditional) subjects—anatomy, physiology, pharmacology, medicinal plants, principles of traditional medicine, pharmacognosy, English and traditional clinical methods.
 Third year: Traditional clinical subjects such as internal medicine, gynecology, child health, ulcers and sores, physical medicine, orthopedics, panchakarma and Chinese acupuncture, and Western pharmacology, preventive and social medicine and clinical methods.
 Fourth year: Continuation of traditional clinical subjects plus additional subjects like research methodology and forensic medicine.
 Fifth year: Internship

References

Educational institutions established in 2002
Universities and colleges in Mandalay
Medical schools in Myanmar
Universities and colleges in Myanmar
2002 establishments in Myanmar